Mountain summits in the United States named Baker Mountain: